Sir Henry Montague Hozier  (20 March 1838 – 28 February 1907) was a British Army officer who became secretary of Lloyd's of London.

Biography
The third son of James C. Hozier of Newlands and Mauldslie Castle, Lanarkshire, Hozier was educated at Rugby School, Edinburgh Academy and the Royal Military Academy, Woolwich. He was successively lieutenant in the Royal Artillery, lieutenant in the 2nd Life Guards and captain in the 3rd Dragoon Guards, and passed first into and out of the Staff College, Camberley. He served with the Royal Artillery in the expedition to Peking, with the German Army in the War of 1866, as assistant military secretary to Sir Robert Napier in the Abyssinian expedition, and as assistant military attaché during the Franco-Prussian War. He was awarded the Iron Cross for his service in the latter conflict, made a Companion of the Bath in 1897, and a Knight Commander of the Bath in 1903.

Upon his retirement from the military, Hozier shifted his interests to the world of business.  In 1872 he joined the Board of the newly formed Patent Cotton-Gunpowder Company. 
In 1874 he was elected secretary of Lloyd's where he remained for thirty-two years. His background in military intelligence undoubtedly led to his work to establish a network of signal stations.  These Hozier describes in an interview in 1895 as follows:  "[O]ne of the new features introduced here by myself, and that of which I am perhaps most proud, has been the development of our means of securing early information. We have established a complete network of signal stations at prominent points upon the sea-coast all the world over. We have placed them mostly on barren isolated spots where there are o shipping agents or newspaper reporters, but directly connected to by cable and wire."  Hozier, now knighted, retired in 1906.  He died while visiting the site of one such signal station in Panama.  
 
Hozier's also served as colonel-commandant of the Royal Arsenal Artillery Volunteers. In Who's Who he gave his recreations as yachting, shooting and hunting. He was the author of The Seven Weeks' War, on the 1866 conflict, and a History of the British Expedition to Abyssinia. He lived at Stonehouse in Lanarkshire and 26A North Audley Street, London, and was a member of the Turf, Junior United Service, City and Beefsteak Clubs in London, the New Club, Edinburgh, the Western Club, Glasgow, and the Royal Northern, Royal Clyde and Temple Yacht Clubs.

He married Lady Blanche Ogilvy, daughter of David Ogilvy, 10th Earl of Airlie. He was the legal father of Clementine Hozier Spencer-Churchill, wife of Sir Winston Churchill, though Clementine's actual paternity has been debated.

References

1838 births
1907 deaths
People from Lanarkshire
People educated at Rugby School
People educated at Edinburgh Academy
Graduates of the Royal Military Academy, Woolwich
Graduates of the Staff College, Camberley
Royal Artillery officers
British Life Guards officers
3rd Dragoon Guards officers
Royal Army Service Corps officers
British Army personnel of the Second Opium War
British military personnel of the Abyssinian War
People of the Franco-Prussian War
Knights Commander of the Order of the Bath
Recipients of the Iron Cross (1870)